Diana Carolina Peñuela Martínez (born 8 September 1986) is a Colombian racing cyclist, who currently rides for UCI Women's Continental Team .

She is known as a sprinter with victories in Criterium Manizales Fair, the Rigorena Circuit, Grand Prix Armenia, Diablo Twilight Criterium, Milwaukee Mile Crit and Bronze medals in the XVII Bolivarian Games in 2013 and the X South American Games in 2014. She competed in the 2013 UCI women's road race in Florence, and the 2015 UCI Road World Championships in Richmond.

Major results

2011
 1st Criterium Manizales Fair
 7th Classic Anapoima
2012
 4th Copa Federacion Venezolana de Ciclismo
 10th Grand Prix GSB
2013
 1st Classic Bogota City
 2nd Criterium Manizales Fair
 3rd  Road race, Bolivarian Games
 4th Road race, National Road Championships
 5th Tour Feminino Colombia
2014
 1st Tour of Galena Illinois
 1st Criterium Manizales Fair
 2nd Road race, National Road Championships
 3rd  Road race, South American Games
 5th Tour of America's Dairyland
 6th Glencoe Grand Prix
 8th Road race, Pan American Road Championships
 10th Grand Prix GSB
2015
 1st Criterium, Texas State Road Championships
 Hotter'N Hell Hundred
1st Road race
1st Criterium
 1st Sun and Ski Summer Criterium
 2nd Road race, National Road Championships
 2nd Chappell Hill Bank Classic
 9th St Francis Tulsa Tough Criterium
 10th Tour of Utah Women's Edition Omnium
2016
 4th Gran Prix San Luis Femenino
2017
 1st Clasica Rionegro
 2nd  Road race, Bolivarian Games
 4th Road race, National Road Championships
 5th Overall Vuelta a Colombia Femenina
1st Points classification
1st Stage 1
 10th Overall Joe Martin Stage Race
2018
 1st Clásica a Zarzal
 1st Stage 2 Vuelta al Valle del Cauca
 3rd Winston-Salem Cycling Classic
 4th Road race, Central American and Caribbean Games
 4th Overall Joe Martin Stage Race
1st Stage 1
 5th Road race, South American Games
 5th Overall Tour of the Gila
1st Stage 5
2019
 5th Clasica Femenina Navarra
2020
 2nd Time trial, National Road Championships
2021
 3rd Road race, National Road Championships
2022
 1st  Road race, National Road Championships
 9th Overall Tour of the Gila
2023
 1st  Road race, National Road Championships

References

External links

1986 births
Living people
Colombian female cyclists
People from Manizales
South American Games bronze medalists for Colombia
South American Games medalists in cycling
Competitors at the 2014 South American Games
20th-century Colombian women
21st-century Colombian women